Bronson may refer to:

People 
 Bronson (name)

Places in the United States 
 Bronson, Florida
 Bronson, Iowa
 Bronson, Kansas
 Bronson, Michigan
 Bronson, Texas
 Bronson Township, Michigan
 Bronson Township, Huron County, Ohio
 Lake Bronson, Minnesota

Other uses 
 Then Came Bronson, American TV series
 Archie Bronson Outfit, an English blues-rock band
 Bronson (film), a film based on the prisoner Michael Peterson's life
 Bronson (group), a collaborative project between American DJs Odesza and Australian producer Golden Features
 Their 2020 album of the same name

See also 
 Branson (disambiguation)
 Branston (disambiguation)
 Justice Bronson (disambiguation)